Olho no Olho (English: Eye to Eye or The Eye Of Fury) is a Brazilian telenovela created by Antônio Calmon, it was produced and aired by TV Globo from September 6, 1993, to April 8, 1994.

Cast

Special participations 
 Monah Delacy - Lenira
 Paulo José - Menelau Zapata
 Stênio Garcia - Armando
 Sérgio Britto - Padre João
 Marcos Paulo - Otávio (Débora's husband)
 Ítalo Rossi - Ferreira
 Arduino Colassanti - Padre Inácio

Soundtrack

National soundtrack 
Capa: Gerson Brenner
 "Gênese" - Paulo Ricardo and RPM
 "Agora Ou Jamais" - Tigres de Bengala
 "Oração de Amor" - Paula Morelenbaum
 "Fúria e Folia" - Barão Vermelho
 "Homem Que Sabia Demais" - Skank
 "Magnificat" - Rútila Máquina (opening theme)
 "Submundo Vaticano" - Lulu Santos
 "Down Em Mim" - Edson Cordeiro
 "Deus Apareça na Televisão" - Kid Abelha
 "Será Que Sou Eu" - Paulinho Moska
 "Não Tem Solução" - Zizi Possi
 "Toda Noite" - Edmon
 "Por Toda Parte" - Franco Perini

International soundtrack 
Capa: Rita Guedes

 "What's Up" - 4 Non Blondes
 "Boom Shack-A-Lak" - Apache Indian
 "Boy, You're The One" - Trinere
 "Informer" - Snow
 "How You Gonna See Me Now" - Easy Rider
 "Vas-Y Vas-Y" - Isabelle Camille
 "To Be With You" - Mc RNT
 "Step It Up" - Stereo MCs
 "A Million Love Songs" - Take That
 "Regret" - New Order
 "Cose della vita" - Eros Ramazzotti
 "Merry-go-round" - Deborah Blando
 "Ça C'est Paris" - Gilbert
 "Are You Ready to Fly" - Rozalla

References

External links 
 

1993 telenovelas
Brazilian telenovelas
TV Globo telenovelas
1993 Brazilian television series debuts
1994 Brazilian television series endings
Portuguese-language telenovelas
Paranormal fiction